Eric De Clercq (born 3 December 1967) is a Belgian former road cyclist, who competed as a professional from 1991 to 2002.

Major results

1989
 1st De Vlaamse Pijl
 3rd Circuit du Hainaut
1990
 3rd Omloop van de Westhoek
1991
 10th Grand Prix de Cannes
1992
 1st Stage 4 Hofbrau Cup
 2nd Stadsprijs Geraardsbergen
 5th Circuit des Frontières
 10th Kampioenschap van Vlaanderen
1993
 1st Stage 5 Kellogg's Tour
 4th GP Stad Zottegem
 8th Kampioenschap van Vlaanderen
1994
 1st Circuit des Frontières
 9th Nationale Sluitingprijs
1995
 2nd Brussel–Ingooigem
1996
 1st Rund um Düren
1997
 3rd GP Aarhus
1998
 1st Zomergem–Adinkerke
 6th Overall Circuit Franco-Belge
 9th GP Rik Van Steenbergen
1999
 8th De Kustpijl
2000
 9th Archer Grand Prix
2001
 1st Omloop der Kempen
 3rd Omloop Mandel-Leie-Schelde
 4th Vlaamse Havenpijl

References

External links

1967 births
Living people
Belgian male cyclists
People from Brakel
Cyclists from East Flanders